Pammene aurana is a moth of the family Tortricidae.

Distribution
This species can be found in most of Europe and the  Palearctic. To the east, the distribution extends over southern Siberia, the Alatau to the region Primorsky Krai in the Far East.

Habitat
These moths occur in gardens, forest clearings, hedgerows, woodland edges, forest roads and roadsides.

Description

Pammene aurana has a wingspan of 9–13 mm. These moths show chocolate brown or reddish brown forewings with yellow-orange blotches. They usually have two almost round yellow-orange spots before the wing's outer edge and a large round or semicircular yellow-orange marking in the middle at the wing's rear edge. The fringes are dark brown. The hind wings are dark. Head, thorax, abdomen and antennae are brown to dark brown. In the form Pammene aurana var. aurantiana the various yellow-orange markings flow together and only the wing base, the costa and the outer edge are brown.

The caterpillars are whitish with a shiny black-brown head.

Biology
Adults are on wing from June to August. They are active in sunshine. The feed on nectar of the common hogweed (Heracleum sphondylium) and of giant hogweed (Heracleum mantegazziannum). There is one generation per year (univoltine species). The eggs are laid in the flowers of said plants. The larvae live within a spinning of the seeds of these flowers and feed on them. They hibernate from October in a silk cocoon under the ground and pupates the following year in spring inside that cocoon. The moths hatch in June and July.

References

External links

 Pammene aurana on microlepidoptera.nl
 Waarneming.nl 
 Commanster

Olethreutinae
Moths described in 1775
Moths of Asia
Tortricidae of Europe
Taxa named by Johan Christian Fabricius
Articles containing video clips